{|

{{Infobox ship class overview
|Name=Berezina-class replenishment ship|Builders=Shipyard named after 61 Communards, Nikolaev
|Operators=*Russian Navy
 Soviet Navy (former)
|Class before=
|Class after=
|Subclasses=
|Cost=
|Built range=
|In service range=
|Ship commissioned=
|Total ships building=
|Total ships planned=
|Total ships completed=1
|Total ships cancelled=
|Total ships active=0
|Total ships laid up=
|Total ships lost=
|Total ships retired=1
|Total ships preserved=
}}

|}Berezina was a fleet replenishment ship used by the Soviet Navy and by the Russian Navy. She was only ship of Project 1833, code Pegasus. The ship served in the Soviet Navy and later Russian Navy Black Sea Fleet from 1975 to 2000. Berezina was scrapped in Aliağa, Turkey in 2003.

Construction
The ship was laid down on 18 August 1972 at the Shipyard named after 61 Communards, Nikolaev, Ukrainian SSR, USSR. Launched 20 April 1975. On 30 December 1975, the ship was commissioned as part of the Black Sea Fleet of the Soviet Navy and was based in Sevastopol. Berezina was heavily armed for a supply ship of the era. Berezina was armed with Osa-M surface-to-air missiles, 57 mm/80 cal AK-725 dual-purpose guns, RBU-1000 anti-submarine rockets and an AK-630M point defense system. Uniquely, in 1986 it was said that Berezina was probably the only auxiliary ship of any nation fitted with sonar and anti-submarine weapons. In 1979, western media reported that it was suspected that four Berezina class supply ships would eventually be built. Only one was completed.

Operations

From 26 May to 28 September 1978, Berezina conducted comprehensive testing in the Black Sea with the carrier Minsk transferring stores via high line and with helicopters. Berezina was able to refuel ships port, starboard and astern. In 1979, Berezina operated in the Mediterranean Sea, transferring cargo and fuel to Tashkent, Minsk and Kiev. In 1980-1981, Berezina operated in the Indian Ocean. In 1982, Berezina operated with the Northern Fleet during a large exercise, transferring cargo to Kiev and Kirov.

In 1985, Berezina returned to the Shipyard named after 61 Communards for repairs and modernization. After shipyard work was completed, Berezina was sent to the Mediterranean Sea. On 14 May 1986, Berezina collided with the steamship Capitan Soroka in fog near Istanbul and was damaged on the port side, down to the waterline. After the collision, the ship returned to Nikolaev for repairs until 1987. On 18 February 1991, Berezina deployed to the Mediterranean Sea for the final time, returning to Sevastopol on 30 August 1991. After the fall of the Soviet Union, Russian Naval activity declined and Berezina was no longer needed for fleet operations and underway replenishment. In 1996, the ship's armaments were removed. She was sponsored by the city of Zelenograd (1995-1997). In March 2002, the ship was sold for scrapping. Berezina was scrapped at Aliağa, Turkey, 9 April 2003.

See also
 Fast combat support ship
 Sacramento-class fast combat support ship (older than Berezina)
 Supply-class fast combat support ship (newer than Berezina)

References

External links

 https://web.archive.org/web/20220501211511/http://www.kchf.ru:80/ship/vspomog/berezina.htm
 https://web.archive.org/web/20111007101154/http://russian-ships.info/vspomog/1833.htm
 Jane's fighting ships 1987-88 - Berezina
 Combat Fleets Of The World 1986/87 by Naval Institute Press - Berezina
 Guide to the Soviet navy by Polmar, Norman 1986 - Berezina
 Project 1833 Berezina class - Soviet Armed Forces 1945-1991

Auxiliary ships of the Russian Navy
Auxiliary ships of the Soviet Navy
Auxiliary replenishment ship classes
Ships built at Shipyard named after 61 Communards
1975 ships